Dicladocera is a genus of biting horseflies of the family Tabanidae.

Species
Dicladocera argentomacula Wilkerson, 1979
Dicladocera basirufa (Walker, 1850)
Dicladocera beaveri Wilkerson, 1979
Dicladocera bellicosa (Brèthes, 1910)
Dicladocera calimaensis Wilkerson, 1979
Dicladocera castanea (Barretto, 1949)
Dicladocera clara (Schiner, 1868)
Dicladocera curta Kröber, 1931
Dicladocera dalessandroi Wilkerson, 1979
Dicladocera distomacula Wilkerson, 1979
Dicladocera exilicorne Fairchild, 1958
Dicladocera fairchildi Goodwin, 1999
Dicladocera fulvicornis Kröber, 1931
Dicladocera griseipennis Kröber, 1931
Dicladocera guttipennis (Wiedemann, 1828)
Dicladocera hemiptera (Surcouf, 1912)
Dicladocera hirsuta Wilkerson, 1979
Dicladocera hoppi Enderlein, 1927
Dicladocera leei Fairchild, 1979
Dicladocera macula (Macquart, 1846)
Dicladocera maculistigma Enderlein, 1925
Dicladocera minos (Schiner, 1868)
Dicladocera molle Coscarón, 1967
Dicladocera mutata Fairchild, 1958
Dicladocera neosubmacula Kröber, 1931
Dicladocera nigrocaerulea (Rondani, 1850)
Dicladocera nova Kröber, 1931
Dicladocera ornatipenne (Kröber, 1931)
Dicladocera perplexus (Walker, 1850)
Dicladocera pruinosa Wilkerson, 1979
Dicladocera riveti (Surcouf, 1919)
Dicladocera rubiginipennis (Macquart, 1846)
Dicladocera simplex (Walker, 1850)
Dicladocera submacula (Walker, 1850)
Dicladocera tribonophora Fairchild, 1958
Dicladocera uncinata (Wulp, 1881)

References

Tabanidae
Diptera of North America
Diptera of South America
Taxa named by Adolfo Lutz
Brachycera genera